Joan O'Flynn (Siobhán Ní Fhloinn) was the 28th president of the Camogie Association.

Background
She was the daughter of GAA administrator Seamus Ó Floinn. She is a graduate of University College Cork (BA 1983) and University College Dublin (Masters in Equality Studies (1998).

Playing career
Her playing career stretched across three counties. She played with her native club Fr O’Neill’s from Ladysbridge/Ballymacoda parish in east Cork when they won their first Cork county championship, with London when they resumed inter-county camogie in 1987 and Celbridge, Co Kildare where she returned to live in 1994, where she played on their first Kildare championship winning team.

Administration
She was chair, secretary and PRO for Co Kildare Camogie Board, a member of Leinster Council, and chair of the National Strategic Plan committee for six years and a member of Management Committee for three years before she defeated Antrim's Catherine O'Hara in a vote at Congress 2009 in Athlone to become the sport’s first president-elect.

Development plan
A strategic review of the Association undertaken during Liz Howard’s presidency led to a new six year National Development Plan, ‘Our Game Our Passion 2010-2015’, launched at Annual Congress in Newbridge in March 2010, with the aim of increasing affiliation from 540 clubs to 750, the membership base by 40pc and attendance levels to 60,000 at the annual All Ireland camogie final. A new Constitution for the Association were developed and ratified at a special Congress in Croke Park in May 2010. Camogie teams were also given greater access to inter-county grounds and camogie allied itself with a campaign to increase the coverage of women’s sport across all media.

Presidency
The Camogie Association's first Player Welfare Committee was established in 2009 and its first Inter County Referees Assessment Programme was established in 2010. First steps to establish underage camogie internationally (particularly in Britain and US) commenced in 2010. A new All Ireland Intermediate Club Championship was inaugurated in 2010. Rules enacted included changing the name of the Association to An Cuymman Camogiocht from Cumann Camogaiochta na nGael, a rule allowing two points for a sideline cut and increasing subs from five to eight in all league games,  the changing of the Gael Linn Cup to a two-year cycle. After a debate, the ban on camogie players wearing shorts was retained.

Her brother Denis was a referee and is PRO of his native club, and her Presidency coincided with another East Cork native Christy Cooney’s tenure as GAA President.

Career
She worked in London as Policy and Information Worker for a charity working with vulnerable young Irish emigrants, worked for Combat Poverty Agency (1994–2009) as Head of Communications. and also spent time as a Programme Manager before becoming a civil servant in the Department of Community Equality and Gaeltacht Affairs.

She was editor of the quarterly journal Action on Poverty Today for fifteen years; editor of Poverty Policy and Practice Combat Poverty 1986-2009 Institute of Public Administration (2009); Rich and Poor, Perspectives on Tackling Inequality in Ireland Oak Tree Press (2001) and author of many other social policy titles and articles.

Her history of camogie in Kildare, Soaring Sliotars, was published in 2004.

References

External links
 Joan O’Flynn interview in Evening Herald 9 February 2010

Presidents of the Camogie Association
Gaelic games players from County Cork
Cork camogie players
Living people
Year of birth missing (living people)
Alumni of University College Cork
Alumni of University College Dublin